The 1911–12 Welsh Amateur Cup was the 22nd season of the Welsh Amateur Cup. The cup was won by Rhos who defeated Summerhill 2–1 in the final at Wrexham.

Preliminary round

First round

Second round

Third round

Fourth round

Semi-final

Final

References

1911-12
Welsh Cup
1911–12 domestic association football cups